José Pedro Cepeda Espinhosa Teixeira (born 16 February 1991 in Braga), known as Zé Pedro, is a Portuguese professional footballer who plays for Vilaverdense F.C. as a central defender.

References

External links

1991 births
Living people
Sportspeople from Braga
Portuguese footballers
Association football defenders
Liga Portugal 2 players
Campeonato de Portugal (league) players
FC Porto players
Padroense F.C. players
Leixões S.C. players
S.C. Covilhã players
F.C. Famalicão players
Gondomar S.C. players
Vilaverdense F.C. players